Epeli Naituivau (born 22 May 1962) is a Fijian former rugby union footballer, who played as prop.

Career
Naituivau debuted for Fiji  against Tonga, at Nuku'alofa, on 24 March 1990. He called in the 1991 Rugby World Cup squad, where he played against Romania and Canada, as well in the 1999 Rugby World Cup squad, where he played against Namibia and England, the latter being his last international cap.

Post-retirement
Naituivau coached Fiji Barbarians in 2009. In 2010 he was technical advisor and forwards coach for Fiji Warriors. Until 2013, he was appointed Development Officer by Fiji Rugby Union

Notes

External links

Fiji international rugby union players
Fijian rugby union players
Rugby union props
1962 births
Living people